A women's Test match is an international four-innings cricket match held over a maximum of four days between two of the ten leading cricketing nations. The first women's Test was played between England and Australia in 1934. As of 2014, the Pakistan women's team have played three Test matches since their first appearance in 1998, against Sri Lanka at the Colts Cricket Club. Pakistan have lost two matches, while one resulted in a draw. Twenty women have played Test matches for Pakistan.

As of 2014, four players have made the most appearances for Pakistan in Women's Test cricket, playing in all the three matches. Five players have appeared in two matches each, and eleven have played in one match each. Shaiza Khan has captained the side in all the three matches. Kiran Baluch has scored the most runs in total, making 360 from 6 innings. Her score of 242, made against West Indies in March 2004, is the highest total by any batsman in Women's Test cricket as of 2014. Khan has taken more wickets than any other Pakistani bowler in this format of the game, dismissing 19 batsmen over 3 matches. She has the best bowling figures in an innings among Pakistani bowlers, 7 wickets for 59 runs. Her 13 wickets for 226 runs in a match is the best performance by any bowler in the format. Khan, Urooj Mumtaz, and Batool Fatima have taken the most catches with three each. Fatima holds the record for the most Test cricket dismissals for Pakistan with five.

The first list comprises all members of the Pakistan Women's cricket team who have played at least one Test match. It is initially arranged in the order in which each player won her first Test cap. Where more than one player won her first Test cap in the same match, those players are listed alphabetically by surname. The second lists those who have represented Pakistan as captain.

Key

Test cricketers
Statistics are correct as of the Pakistan women's most recent Test match, against West Indies on 15 March 2004.

Test captains

References

External links

   
Pakistan
Test cricketers
Test